Gamers was Nebraska's oldest video game store EST. in 1993 by Dale Miller. Gamers at its peak had 14 locations, 5 being in Nebraska and the rest being in Iowa. Gamers originated in Omaha, NE at its first location off 72nd and Dodge.

On September 26th, 2018 Gamers was foreclosed on, permanently closing all of its remaining locations. 5 months later, Gamers returned under new ownership, with some locations reopened, along with some new locations.

References

Video game retailers of the United States
Companies based in Omaha, Nebraska
American companies established in 1993
American companies disestablished in 2018
Retail companies established in 1993
Retail companies disestablished in 2018